Shiann Darkangelo (born November 28, 1993) is an American ice hockey player who currently plays with the Toronto Six of the Premier Hockey Federation (PHF). She has played at the international level with Team USA and won gold at the 2016 IIHF Women's World Championship with the team. At the NCAA Division I level, she accumulated 42 points with the Syracuse Orange women's ice hockey program during the 2011–12 and 2012–13 seasons and registered 60 points with the Quinnipiac Bobcats women's ice hockey program during the 2013–14 and 2014–15 seasons.

Playing career

Premier Hockey Federation
Darkangelo played the 2015 season with the Connecticut Whale in the Premier Hockey Federation (PHF) and was selected to participate in the 1st NWHL All-Star Game. On July 31, Darkangelo signed a one-year contract for $21,000 with the Buffalo Beauts. She was selected to participate in the 2nd NWHL All-Star Game in 2017.

In April 2020, after one year spent playing with the GTA West chapter of the PWHPA, she was announced as one of the first five players signed the Toronto Six, the first NWHL team in Canada. The initial group comprised two defensemen, one goaltender, and two forwards, Darkangelo and Taylor Woods.

CWHL
Darkangelo spent the 2017–18 CWHL season playing for the Canadian Women's Hockey League expansion team Kunlun Red Star based in Shenzhen, China. Darkangelo's first point with the Red Star took place on October 28, 2017, on a power play goal at the 1:43 mark of a second period match against the Calgary Inferno.

Darkangelo's goal was assisted by Hongxin Yan and Zhixin Liu, who all gained their first career CWHL points on the play.

On August 2, 2018, Darkangelo signed a contract with the Toronto Furies.

NWHL
One year following the dissolution of the CWHL, the NWHL announced an expansion team for Toronto. Dubbed the Six, the leadership for their inaugural season (2020-21) included Darkangelo, appointed as the first team captain in franchise history, while Emma Woods and Emma Greco served as alternate captains. Collobrating with Emma Woods, they would assist on the first goal scored in Toronto Six franchise history.  Scored by Lindsay Eastwood, the goal took place in the second game of the 2020–21 NWHL season, scored against Minnesota Whitecaps goaltender Amanda Leveille .

International 

In 2011, Darkangelo won the gold medal with USA Hockey at the U18 IIHF Women's World Championships. In 2016, she would win gold with the US at the senior IIHF Women's World Championships, picking up 4 points in 5 games.

Personal life 

Darkangelo was born in Royal Oak, Michigan and raised in Brighton, Michigan. She has five siblings, three brothers, Anthony, Austin, and Isaac; and two sisters, Mariah and Ciara. Her younger brother Isaac led the Northern Michigan Wildcats in tackles in the 2019–20 season before transferring to Illinois University to play with the Illinois Fighting Illini football program of the NCAA Division I in April 2020.

Darkangelo follows a plant-based diet. She is a certified plant-based nutritionist and owner of Plant-Based Performance, a whole foods, plant-based lifestyle coaching company.

Career stats

Regular season and playoffs 

Sources: USCHO.com, Elite Prospects, HockeyDB, NWHL, CWHL

International

Source: Elite Prospects, USA Hockey

Awards and honors

Collegiate 

Weekly/monthly collegiate honours and awards

 ECAC Hockey Player of the Month (1)
 February 2014
 ECAC Hockey Player of the Week (1)
 March 4, 2014
 CHA Hockey Player of the Week (1)
 January 14, 2013
 CHA Honor Roll (3)
 2012–13: October 22, October 29
 2011–12: January 9
 CHA Hockey Rookie of the Week (1)
 March 5, 2012

References

External links

 
 
 Shiann Darkangelo at Quinnipiac Bobcats
 Shiann Darkangelo at USA Hockey
 

1993 births
Living people
American women's ice hockey forwards
Buffalo Beauts players
Connecticut Whale (PHF) players
Premier Hockey Federation players
Isobel Cup champions
Shenzhen KRS Vanke Rays players
Syracuse Orange women's ice hockey players
Quinnipiac Bobcats women's ice hockey players
Toronto Six players